Our Lady of Assiut is the name given to a series of reported apparitions of the Virgin Mary in 2000 and 2001 in Assiut, Egypt.

History
The apparitions of Our Lady of Assiut were mass apparitions in Assiut, Egypt, during 2000 and 2001. Thousands of witnesses produced photographs of them, which were reprinted in several newspapers. 
According to newspaper reports, during mass, pictures showing Our Lady with a dove above her that were hung on the wall inside the altar began to glow, after which the light from the dove in the pictures started to flow down. Later, the lights appeared above the church as well.

The Coptic Church approved the apparition.

Gallery

See also

Our Lady of Warraq
Our Lady of Zeitoun
Coptic Orthodox Church

Further reading 
Père François Brune (2004): La Vièrge de l'Egypte. L'incroyable apparition de Marie à des millions d'Egyptiens. Le jardin des livres. 
Laurentin, René (2007): Dictionnaire des "apparitions" de la Vierge Marie. - Paris: Fayard.

References

External links
Our Lady of Assiut

Assiut